The Bicutan AGT is an automated guideway transit (AGT) system under development  within the City of Taguig in the Philippines.  It will serve as test track for the second mass transit system to be built and developed in the country by local engineers. 

Despite some media reports calling it a monorail, the system uses two parallel concrete beams to form a track.

See also
Automated Guideway Transit System project (Philippines)

References

Automated guideway transit
Taguig
Rail transportation in Metro Manila